James Peter Julitih Ongkili (13 March 1939–20 March 2006) was a Malaysian politician. He was the Minister of Justice from 1982 to 1986 and Deputy Chief Minister of Sabah from 1976 to 1981. He was also the Member of Sabah State Legislative Assembly for Tamparuli from 1976 to 1981 and Member of Parliament for Tuaran from 1978 to 1986.

Family 
James was born on 13 March 1939 in Kampung Karanaan, Tambunan, Sabah. His widow, Datin Margaret Ganduong Ahing (born 1937), was a native of Tamparuli (from the village of Kiulu) and the couple had 6 children. His brother, Maximus Ongkili was a federal minister from 2004 to 2022 and has been the President of United Sabah Party since 2017.

Education 
He firstly attended St. Theresa's Primary School, Tondulu and St. Martin's Secondary School, Tampasak in his hometown of Tambunan and later attended St. Francis Xavier's Secondary School, Keningau for his upper secondary education stage and later completed his sixth form in La Salle Secondary School Tanjung Aru, Kota Kinabalu. In addition, he also holds a Bachelor of Arts degree from University of Queensland and a PhD from the University of Malaya.

Early career 
He began his career as a district officer in Kinabatangan from 1965 to 1967 and later in Keningau from 1967 to 1969. In addition, he served as a lecturer in University of Malaya from 1969 to 1976.

Politics 
In April 1976, James contested for the Tamparuli state seat on the ticket of BERJAYA and was appointed as the Sabah State Minister of Agriculture and Fisheries. Later, he was then appointed as the Second Deputy Chief Minister of Sabah cum State Minister of Industrial and Rural Development on 17 July 1976. On 18 March 1977, he was elected as the Deputy President of BERJAYA. In the 1978 general election, he contested for the Tuaran federal seat. 

On 2 June 1983, he was appointed as a Minister in the Prime Minister's Department (in charge of Parliamentary Affairs and Law) and became the ex-officio Minister of Justice on 14 July 1984.

In July 1986, he announced that he was retiring from politics and in May 1988, he quitted BERJAYA. However, two months later, he established Sabah People's Party and became the first president of the party. In July 1990, he contested in the 1990 Sabah state election for the Tamparuli state seat on a PRS ticket but he lost to Wilfred Bumburing from PBS. On 1 August 1990, he announced his retirement as President of PRS and from the political arena. But, in March 1991, he announced that he joined PBS.

Election result

Health 
As a result of stroke attacks, he was wheelchair-bound for 10 years and had to consume 6 different types of medication after suffering a third stage stroke. He passed away at Queen Elizabeth Hospital, Kota Kinabalu on 20 March 2006, aged 67. His funeral was held in the Catholic Church of St. John the Evangelist, Kampung Labuaya, Tuaran on 22 March and was buried right in the front courtyard of his house at Bukit Aman Villa, Kiulu, Tamparuli, Tuaran.

Honours 
  :
  Knight Companion of the Order of the Crown of Pahang (DIMP)  – Dato’ (1976)
 :
  Commander of the Order of Kinabalu (PGDK) – Datuk  (1978)

References 

20th-century Malaysian politicians
People from Sabah
University of Queensland alumni
Malaysian Roman Catholics
University of Malaya alumni
Sabah People's United Front politicians
Kadazan-Dusun people
United Sabah Party politicians
Members of the Dewan Rakyat
Members of the Sabah State Legislative Assembly
1939 births
2006 deaths